Lucía Lacarra (born 24 March 1975) is a Spanish ballet dancer who has been a principal with the Bayerisches Staatsballett (Bavarian State Opera Ballet) since 2002. A recipient of the Prix Benois de la Danse, she was named the Dancer of the Decade in 2011, at the World Ballet Stars Gala in Saint Petersburg.

Early life
Born in the Basque town of Zumaia, Gipuzkoa, Lacarra was interested in dance from an early age but only received training from the age of 10 when a ballet school opened in her home town. After participating in a summer course run by Rosella Hightower, she studied for three years with Mentxu Medel in San Sebastián before attending Víctor Ullate's school in Madrid, along with Tamara Rojo and Angel Corella. She soon became a member of his Ballet de Victor Ullate, dancing George Balanchine's Allegro Brillante when she was 15, as well as other modern abstract ballets.

Career
After four seasons with Ullate, she moved to Roland Petit's Ballet de Marseille as a principal, dancing leading Esmeralda in his Notre Dame de Paris. Over the next three years, she created roles in seven other Petit ballets including Le Guépard where she danced Angélique, and Le jeune homme et la mort where she partnered with Nicolas Le Riche. In 1997, she joined the San Francisco Ballet where she performed in various classical and contemporary works, taking the title role in Helgi Tómasson's Giselle (1999). There, she paired with the Frenchman, Cyril Pierre, whom she married in 1998. 

In 2002, Lacarra moved to Munich where she became a principal with the Bayerisches Staatsballett, partnering Cyril Pierre with whom she has participated in guest performances around the world. In recent years, she has created the roles of Princess Natalia and of Princess Odette in John Neumeier's Illusions – Like Swan Lake, Katharina in John Cranko's The Taming of the Shrew and Hippolyta/Titania in Neumeier's A Midsummer Night's Dream. From 2007, she began a dancing partnership with Marlon Dino which led to their marriage in 2010.

Awards
In 2002, Lacarra received the Nijinsky Award. In 2003, at a gala in Moscow's Bolshoi Theatre she was awarded the Prix Benois de la Danse as best female dancer for her role of Tatjana in Cranko's Onegin. In 2011, at the World Ballet Stars Gala in St Petersburg, she was named the Dancer of the Decade.

References

1975 births
Spanish ballerinas
Prima ballerinas
People from Urola Kosta
Prix Benois de la Danse winners
Living people